"Beside You" is a song recorded by Canadian pop-rock group Marianas Trench for their second studio album Masterpiece Theatre. It was released for digital download by 604 Records on February 24, 2009.

The band performed the song at the Edmonton Event Centre for the Beside You tour on November 2, 2009. It reached No. 27 for the Canadian Hot 100; the song was certified Platinum by Music Canada on February 22, 2010.

Composition
Beside You incorporates 70s and 80s classic rock influence in its chorus harmonies. In contrast to the songs on the album Masterpiece Theatre, which make use of guitar riffs and a structure utilizing a catchy chorus, the song instead uses instrumentals such as acoustic guitar, which results in a softer sound.

Live performance
The band performed at the Edmonton Event Centre for the Beside You tour on November 2, 2009, alongside a lineup consisting of Carly Rae Jepsen, The New Cities, and The Mission District.

Track listing
Digital download
"Beside You" – 3:38

Charts and certifications

Weekly charts

Year-end chart

Certifications

References

2009 songs
604 Records singles
Marianas Trench (band) songs
Songs written by Josh Ramsay